Weightlifting was contested from May 6 to May 8 at the 1954 Asian Games in Manila, Philippines. The competition included only men's events for seven different weight categories.

Medalists

Medal table

References
 Results

External links
 Weightlifting Database

 
1954 Asian Games events
1954
Asian Games
1954 Asian Games